Rumex acetosella, commonly known as red sorrel, sheep's sorrel, field sorrel and sour weed, is a species of flowering plant in the buckwheat family Polygonaceae. Native to Eurasia and the British Isles, the plant and its subspecies are common perennial weeds. It has green arrowhead-shaped leaves and red-tinted deeply ridged stems, and it sprouts from an aggressive and spreading rhizome. The flowers emerge from a tall, upright stem. Female flowers are maroon in color.

Description
Rumex acetosella is a perennial herb which spreads via rhizomes. It blooms during March to November, when yellowish-green (male) or reddish (female) flowers develop on separate plants at the apex of the stem, which develop into the red fruits (achenes).

It should not be confused with the similarly named R. acerosella, which also contains oxalic acid and should not be eaten in excess.

Distribution and habitat
Native to Eurasia and the British Isles, R. acetosella has been introduced to most of the rest of the Northern Hemisphere. It is commonly found on acidic, sandy soils in heaths and grassland. It is often one of the first species to take hold in disturbed areas, such as abandoned mining sites, especially if the soil is acidic.

The plant is dioecious, with separate male and female plants. It has been found that in early successional habitats, there are relatively more female plants, while in later successional stages, male plants are more common.

Ecology
Livestock will graze on the plant, but it is not very nutritious and is toxic in large amounts because of oxalates. Italian agronomist Nicola Onorati (1764–1822) first discovered that the plant damages the teeth of animals that crop this plant because of the oxalic acid it contains.

Ground-feeding songbirds eat the seeds, and larger animals like rabbits and deer browse the greens.

The American copper or small copper butterfly depends on it for food, although its larvae can consume some related plants.

The plant is widely considered to be a hard-to-control noxious weed due to its spreading rhizome. Blueberry farmers are familiar with the weed because it thrives in the same conditions under which blueberries are cultivated.

Toxicity
The plant contains oxalic acid and derivatives, known as oxalates.

Uses 
The leaves can be eaten raw or cooked, with the water changed to reduce its strong taste. The oxalic acid they contain lend them a somewhat sour taste. There are several uses of sheep sorrel in the preparation of food including a garnish, a tart flavoring agent, a salad green, and a curdling agent for milk in cheese-making. The leaves have a lemony, tangy or rhubarb-like tart flavor. It is also known as sheep shower in parts of the country.

References

Sources

External links 

 
 
 
 Weed of the Week - United States Department of Agriculture Forest Service
  Missouri Plants, More pictures

Edible plants
Flora of Europe
Medicinal plants
acetosella
Flora of Asia
Plants described in 1753
Taxa named by Carl Linnaeus
Dioecious plants